is a Japanese retired football player. His playing position is centre-back.   He has previously played for Japanese sides Shimizu S-Pulse, Yokohama F. Marinos and Ventforet Kofu as well as Thailand's Muangthong United.

Club career

After graduating from Maebashi Ikuei High School in 2004, Aoyama signed full professional terms with Shimizu S-Pulse the following year and went on to become a regular first team starting member, playing 121 league games in 6 seasons in Shizuoka.

He transferred to Yokohama F. Marinos ahead of the 2011 season, but struggled to establish himself in their top team, playing just 10 and 7 league games respectively in his 2 years at the Nissan Stadium.   2013 saw him move north to Yamanashi to start a 2 season spell with Ventforet Kofu where he scored 4 goals in 59 league appearances which saw them finish 15th in 2013 and 13th the following year.

His career took a very different turn in 2015 as he moved to Thailand to sign for Muangthong United.   His spell with the Kirins was to prove to be highly successful, winning the Thai Premier League in 2016 and the League Cup in 2016 and 2017.   He played more than 100 games in total in his 4 years in Thailand.

Aoyama returned to Japan ahead of the 2019 season and joined Gamba Osaka.

Club statistics
Last Updated:10 February 2019.

Honours
Muangthong United
Thai League 1
Winners (1): 2016
 Runners-up (1):  2015
Thai FA Cup
 Runners-up (1): 2015
Kor Royal Cup
 Runners-up (1): 2016
Thai League Cup
Champions (2): 2016, 2017
 Thailand Champions Cup
Champions (1): 2017
 Mekong Club Championship
Champions (1): 2017

References

External links
 

1986 births
Living people
Association football people from Aichi Prefecture
Japanese footballers
J1 League players
J3 League players
Shimizu S-Pulse players
Yokohama F. Marinos players
Ventforet Kofu players
Naoaki Aoyama
Naoaki Aoyama
Gamba Osaka players
Gamba Osaka U-23 players
Kagoshima United FC players
Japanese expatriate footballers
Expatriate footballers in Thailand
Japanese expatriate sportspeople in Thailand
Footballers at the 2006 Asian Games
Association football central defenders
Asian Games competitors for Japan